Blok M is a business and shopping quarter located in Kebayoran Baru, South Jakarta, Indonesia. It runs east from Iskandarsyah street to Bulungan street in the west. North from Falatehan street to Melawai street in the south. The development is similar to some of the developments near Kota, West Jakarta. On daily basis crowds of people throng its street, and even more so during night time. Much of the popularity of the quarter is due to the prices of goods (which are often low due to the relatively inexpensive property costs for vendors), and the night life.

Shopping
Mal Blok M, the main shopping portion of the quarter. Built on the terminal basement since 1993. The mall is known for having low prices but bargaining is considered a requirement. Blok M Square, Blok M Plaza and Pasaraya Grande are the main shopping centres in Blok M. Built in 1992, the Plaza is a modern mall. Pasaraya Grande is a department store run by Abdul Latief. Its two contiguous buildings include a big food court in the basement are international standard with corresponding prices. A movie theatre is at the top floor.

Part of Blok M Square is known as Little Tokyo from its collection of Japanese restaurants, food stalls, karaoke bars and massage parlours.

Clubs and cafes

There are plenty cafes, Karaoke, massage parlour within the area.
Jalan Melawai, which is known as Little Tokyo has many Japanese style restaurants, bars and cafes.
 Faltehan street also has many cafe, bars and massage parlor.

M Bloc Space
It is a creative complex, which was previously an abandoned housing complex. The place has music venue, trendy restaurants, coffee shops, bar, beauty clinic, record store,  museum Gallery and community Hall. The M Bloc Market is an ecofriendly market for small businesses products, such as coffee, fruits and vegetables. Its a popular hangout place specially among youngsters.

Transportation
Blok M has one of the largest bus stations in Jakarta which many Transjakarta (via its Blok M bus station) and Kopaja buses depart from. The area is also served by Jakarta MRT with Blok M BCA MRT station which directly connected to Blok M Plaza.

References

Shopping districts and streets in Indonesia
Tourist attractions in Jakarta
Red-light districts in Indonesia
South Jakarta
Japantowns

External links
Blok M Information
Audio recording of Blok M street sounds